, also written as 2012 GX17, is a minor body classified as Centaur and Trans-Neptunian object by the Minor Planet Center.
 The object was once considered a promising Neptune L5 trojan candidate.

Discovery
 was discovered on 14 April 2012 by the Pan-STARRS 1 telescope, observing from Haleakala, Hawaii.

Orbit
 follows a rather eccentric orbit (0.55) with a semi-major axis of 37.4 AU. This object also has high orbital inclination (32.5º).

Physical properties
 is a rather large minor body with an absolute magnitude of 7.6 which gives a characteristic diameter of 60–200 km for an assumed albedo in the range 0.5–0.05.

Former Neptune trojan candidate
Initially,  was considered to be a promising Neptune trojan candidate, based on a very preliminary determination of 30.13 AU for its semi-major axis. However, the true value is much larger (37.4 AU) and it is now classified as a Trans-Neptunian object.

References

External links 
 Four temporary Neptune co-orbitals: (148975) 2001 XA255, (310071) 2010 KR59, (316179) 2010 EN65, and 2012 GX17 by de la Fuente Marcos, C., & de la Fuente Marcos, R. 2012, Astronomy and Astrophysics,  Volume 547, id.L2, 7 pp.
 Early discovery note
  data at MPC
 IAU list of centaurs and scattered-disk objects
 IAU list of trans-neptunian objects
 Another list of TNOs
 The Long Term Dynamical Stability of the Known Neptune Trojans, Jack Lang Soutter, Master of Science thesis (not a Neptune trojan)
 

Minor planet object articles (unnumbered)

20120414